Terry Michael Duncan (1966 – October 3, 1993) was an American citizen who was killed by pro-Yeltsin troops during the 1993 Russian constitutional crisis.

Born in the U.S. state of Georgia, Duncan went to Tulane University for undergrad and earned his law degree from George Washington University in Washington, D.C. Alongside Jamison Firestone, Duncan moved to Moscow to establish the law firm Firestone Duncan & Associates, which employed Russian accountant and auditor Sergey Magnitsky.

Duncan was killed on October 3, 1993 near TV center Ostankino by a gunshot to the head, when parliamentary forces attempted to storm the TV premises. He had gone to the TV center with demonstrators and couldn't easily leave the area.

One after another, he rescued wounded people from the zone of gunfire and returned again under bullets, demonstrating extraordinary heroism. According to Russian sources, he has rescued 12 people. A friend of him said, "He was always a risky person, and took care of those in hard situations." The last person who Duncan attempted to save was an injured photo reporter of the New York Times newspaper, Otto Pohl, but a sniper from the TV center building shot Duncan in the head (according to a different source, Duncan was killed by "a casual bullet").

After the shooting his body was carried away by soldiers of a special unit from the TV center building to Argunovskaya street. There are several eyewitnesses to the shooting, as well as video and photographic footage. He was survived by his father, mother and his younger brother.

Firestone Duncan

The name of the law firm that Duncan founded alongside his business partner Jamison Firestone, "Firestone Duncan", resurfaced in the news after the death of its auditor Sergey Magnitsky in 2009.

References

External links
Short biography (in Russian)
"We remember..." entry on Terry Duncan (in Russian)
Caught in the crosshairs of history; In Moscow, Mike Duncan Died a Hero by  Laura Blumenfeld, Washington Post, October 21, 1993
Clinton relays message from Russia to grieving parents, The Atlanta Journal and The Atlanta Constitution, May 15, 1994 
In the Stream of History: Shaping Foreign Policy for a New Era by Warren Christopher, 1998, page 99

1993 in Russia
20th-century American lawyers
1966 births
1993 deaths
Deaths by firearm in Russia